Heinrich Schneier (21 December 1925 – 29 October 2022) was a German politician. A member of the Social Democratic Party, he served in the Landtag of Bavaria from 1962 to 1974.

Schneier died on 29 October 2022, at the age of 96.

References

1925 births
2022 deaths
Members of the Landtag of Bavaria
People from Haßberge (district)
Social Democratic Party of Germany politicians